This is a list of members elected to the Rastriya Panchayat in the 1981 Nepalese Rastriya Panchayat election and subsequent by-elections.

The list is arranged by district for elected members and zones for nominated members. Marich Man Singh Shrestha and Tulsi Giri served as chairmen; while Surya Bahadur Thapa, Lokendra Bahadur Chand and Nagendra Prasad Rijal served as prime ministers during the term of the panchayat.

List of members elected

List of nominated members

By-election

References

External links 

 नेपालको निर्वाचनको इतिहास

General election
1981 in Nepal
Members of the Rastriya Panchayat
Nepalese general election